The State legislatures of India may refer to:
State Legislative Councils
State Legislative Assemblies

See also
Legislatures of British India